William, Bill or Billy Flynn may refer to:
William Flynn (American football) (died 1958), American football coach
William Flynn (golfer) (1890–1944), golf course architect
William "Billy" Flynn, responsible for the murder of Gregory Smart, the husband of Pamela Smart
William J. Flynn (1867–1928), director of the Bureau of Investigation, 1919–1921
William J. Flynn (athletic director) (died 1997), American college athletics administrator
William S. Flynn (1885–1966), Governor of Rhode Island, 1923–1925
William Flynn (1926–2018), CEO, chairman, then chairman emeritus of Mutual of America
Bill Flynn (Australian politician) (1951–2011), Queensland MP and leader of One Nation
Bill Flynn (Florida politician) (1917–1984), American politician in the Florida House of Representatives
Bill Flynn (New Jersey politician) (born 1938), American politician in the New Jersey General Assembly
Bill Flynn (1948–2007), South African film and theater actor and comedian
Billy Flynn (musician) (born 1956), American Chicago blues guitarist
Bill Flynn (footballer) (1907–1991), former Australian rules footballer
Billy Flynn (actor) (born 1985), American actor
Billy Flynn (Chicago), fictional lawyer from the musical Chicago

See also 
William Flinn (1851–1924), U.S. political figure